Azhar Attari (born 12 December 1990) is a Pakistani first-class cricketer who plays for Lahore cricket team. He was named in Pakistan's squad for the 2008 Under-19 Cricket World Cup.

References

External links
 

1990 births
Living people
Pakistani cricketers
Lahore cricketers
Panadura Sports Club cricketers
Cricketers from Lahore